Aldair Cravid D´Almeida (born 9 September 1989), commonly known as Primo, is a São Toméan footballer who plays as a goalkeeper for Sporting Praia Cruz and the São Tomé and Príncipe national team.

International career
Primo made his international debut for São Tomé and Príncipe in 2017.

References

1989 births
Living people
Association football goalkeepers
São Tomé and Príncipe footballers
São Tomé and Príncipe international footballers
Sporting Praia Cruz players